Adhif Syan bin Abdullah is a Malaysian politician from the Malaysian United Indigenous Party (BERSATU), a component party of the ruling Perikatan Nasional (PN) coalition at the federal level and opposition at the state level. He currently serving as the Member of the Selangor State Legislative Assembly for Dengkil since 2018.

Controversies 
Adhif Syan was arrested by the police along with several officials from the federal ministry in a raid on a condominium hosting a fun party on 12 January 2020 at around 1.30am. He was found drug negative when a pathology test was performed.

Election results

References

External links 
 

Living people
1981 births
People from Selangor
Malaysian people of Malay descent
Malaysian Muslims
Malaysian United Indigenous Party politicians
Members of the Selangor State Legislative Assembly
21st-century Malaysian politicians